Jasjit Singh may refer to:

Jasjit Singh (IAF officer) (1934–2013), Indian military officer, writer and military strategist
Jasjit Singh (tennis) (born 1948), Indian Davis Cup tennis player
Jasjit Singh Kular (born 1989), Indian field hockey player